Han Changfu (born 10 October 1954) is a Chinese politician. Until December 2020 he was Minister of Agriculture and Rural Affairs. Before he was Governor of Jilin province.

Han joined the Chinese Communist Party in January 1974. He holds a doctorate in law. He has previously held numerous positions in the Communist Youth League, as well as deputy director and vice Party secretary of the State Council Research Office. Han served as vice-Party secretary and vice governor of Jilin province, before becoming governor in January 2007. He served in this position before becoming minister of agriculture in December 2009.

Han is a member of the 17th, 18th, and 19th Central Committees of the Chinese Communist Party.

References

1954 births
Living people
People's Republic of China politicians from Heilongjiang
Renmin University of China alumni
Politicians from Harbin
Chinese Communist Party politicians from Heilongjiang
Governors of Jilin
Ministers of Agriculture of the People's Republic of China
Members of the 17th Central Committee of the Chinese Communist Party
Members of the 18th Central Committee of the Chinese Communist Party
Members of the 19th Central Committee of the Chinese Communist Party